When the Wind Blows is a 1986 British animated disaster film directed by Jimmy Murakami based on Raymond Briggs' comic book or graphic novel of the same name. The film stars the voices of John Mills and Peggy Ashcroft as the two main characters and was scored by Roger Waters. The film recounts a rural English couple's attempt to survive a nearby nuclear attack and maintain a sense of normality in the subsequent fallout and nuclear winter.

The film was Briggs' second collaboration with TVC, after their efforts with a special based on another work of his, The Snowman, in 1982. It was distributed by Recorded Releasing in the UK, and by Kings Road Entertainment in the United States. A subsequent graphic novel by Briggs, Ethel and Ernest (1998), makes it clear that Briggs based the protagonist couple in When the Wind Blows on his own parents.

When the Wind Blows is a hybrid of traditional and stop-motion animation. The characters of Jim and Hilda Bloggs are hand-drawn, as well as the area outside of the Bloggses house, but their home and most of the objects in it are real objects that seldom move but are animated with stop motion when they do. The stop motion environments utilised are based on the style used for the Protect and Survive public information films. "Protect And Survive" is also featured as the booklet that Jim takes instructions from to survive the nuclear attack.

The soundtrack album features music by David Bowie (who performed the title song), Roger Waters, Genesis, Squeeze, Hugh Cornwell and Paul Hardcastle.

Plot 
Jim Bloggs and his wife two years his senior, Hilda, are an elderly couple, living in a tidy isolated cottage in rural Sussex, in southeast England (located near Lewes, as indicated on the bus Jim rides on). Jim frequently travels to the local town to read newspapers and keep abreast of the deteriorating international situation regarding the Soviet–Afghan War; while frequently misunderstanding some specifics of the conflict, he is fully aware of the growing risk of an all-out nuclear war with the Soviet Union. Jim is horrified at a radio news report stating that a war may be only three days away, and sets about preparing for the worst as instructed by his government-issued Protect and Survive pamphlets. As Hilda continues her daily routine, and their son Ron (living elsewhere), who is implied to have fallen into fatalistic despair, dismisses such preparations as pointless (referencing the song "We Will All Go Together When We Go" by Tom Lehrer), Jim builds a lean-to shelter out of several doors inside their home (which he consistently calls the "inner core or refuge" per the pamphlets) and prepares a stock of supplies. As Jim goes on a shopping trip for the food supplies, he is unable to get any bread, due to "panic purchasing". He also follows through seemingly strange instructions such as painting his windows with white paint and readying sacks to lie down in when a nuclear strike hits. Despite Jim's concerns, he and Hilda are confident they can survive the war, as they did the Second World War, and that a Soviet defeat will ensue.

Hearing a warning on the radio of an imminent ICBM strike, Jim rushes himself and Hilda into their shelter, just escaping injury as distant shock waves batter their home. They remain in the shelter for a couple of nights, and when they emerge, they find all their utilities, services and communications have been destroyed by the nuclear blast. In spite of the shelter Jim has built, over the following days, they gradually grow sick from exposure to the radioactive fallout, resulting in radiation poisoning.

In spite of all this, Jim and Hilda stoically attempt to carry on, preparing tea and dinners on a camping stove, noting numerous errands they will have to run once the crisis passes, and trying to renew their evaporated water stock with (contaminated) rainwater. Jim keeps faith that a rescue operation will be launched to help civilians. They step out into the garden, where radioactive ash has blocked out the sun and caused heavy fog. They are oblivious to the dead animals and the few remaining animals suffering from the radiation (or scavenging on the dead in the case of rats), the destroyed buildings of the nearby town and scorched, dead vegetation outside their cottage (aside from their own garden). The couple initially remains optimistic; however, as they take in the debris of their home, prolonged isolation, lack of food and water, growing radiation sickness, and confusion about the events that have taken place, they begin to fall into a state of despair.

As they continue to attempt to survive, Jim worries that the Soviet military will come to attack their house (having a vision where a tall, red-eyed Soviet soldier with a bayoneted tommy gun breaks into their house), and that they will have to kill them or be sent to a concentration camp. Hilda humorously suggests offering a cup of tea to them, saying that "Russians like tea". The Soviet military never comes however.

Hilda, whose symptoms are worsening, encounters a rat in the dried toilet, which frightens her severely. Her encounter with the rat, as well as her worrying symptoms - bloody diarrhoea (which Jim says is haemorrhoids), and her bleeding gums (which Jim says is caused by ill-fitting dentures) - cause her to be become slightly more suspicious of her impending fate. Jim still tries to comfort her, still optimistic that he may be able to get medications for her from the chemist.

After a few days, the Bloggs are practically bedridden, and Hilda is despondent when her hair begins to fall out, after vomiting, developing painful sores and lesions. Either in denial, unaware of the extent of the nuclear holocaust, or unable to comprehend it, Jim is still confident that emergency services will eventually arrive, but they never do. Hilda is subliminally aware of her fate, and suggests getting back into the paper sacks. Jim, now losing the last of his optimism, agrees to Hilda's suggestion. The dying Jim and Hilda get into the paper sacks, crawl back into the shelter, and pray. Jim tries reciting several different prayers as well as Psalm 23, but, forgetting the lines, starts to read "The Charge of the Light Brigade." The line "into the valley of the shadow of death" distresses the dying Hilda, who weakly asks him not to continue. Finally, Jim's voice mumbles away into silence as he finishes the line, "...rode the Six Hundred..." Outside the shelter, the smoke and ash-filled sky begins to clear, revealing the sun rising through the gloom. At the very end of the credits, a Morse code signal taps out "MAD", which stands for mutual assured destruction.

Cast
 Peggy Ashcroft as Hilda Bloggs
 John Mills as Jim Bloggs
 Robin Houston as Radio 4 Announcer
 James Russell as Additional Voice
 David Dundas as Additional Voice
 Matt Irving as Additional Voice

Reception
When the Wind Blows received positive reviews, currently having an 88% rating on Rotten Tomatoes based on 8 reviews. Critic Barry Lappin called it "Absolutely brilliant.... It was very subtly done but the message more than gets through well". He explained that the scenes are "more than touching" and encouraged people to watch it to the very end.

Colin Greenland reviewed When the Wind Blows for White Dwarf #85, and stated that "The story of Jim and Hilda Bloggs preparing for the Bomb and trying to get back to normal afterwards is heavy-handed, especially at the end, and would have been better shorter; there are odd continuity problems between the pictures and the dialogue. But it is powerful, ludicrous and shocking. It gets to you. As it ought to."

Soundtrack
Originally, David Bowie was supposed to contribute several songs to the soundtrack for the film, but decided to pull out so he could focus on his upcoming album Never Let Me Down, and instead only submitted the title track. Roger Waters was brought in to complete the project instead.

Track listing
All tracks written by Roger Waters and performed by Waters and The Bleeding Heart Band except where noted. On some versions of the album, the Roger Waters tracks are all put into one 24:26 song. The lyrics to the closing song, "Folded Flags", feature a reference to the song "Hey Joe" in the lines "Hey Joe, where you goin' with that gun in your hand?" and "Hey Joe, where you goin' with that dogma in your head?"
"When the Wind Blows" (lyrics: Bowie; music: Bowie, Erdal Kızılçay) – 3:35
Performed by David Bowie
"Facts And Figures" (Hugh Cornwell) – 4:19
Performed by Hugh Cornwell
"The Brazilian" (Tony Banks, Phil Collins, Mike Rutherford) – 4:51
Performed by Genesis
"What Have They Done?" (Chris Difford, Glenn Tilbrook) – 3:39
Performed by Squeeze
"The Shuffle" (Paul Hardcastle) – 4:16
Performed by Paul Hardcastle
"The Russian Missile" – 0:10
"Towers of Faith" – 7:00
"Hilda's Dream" – 1:36
"The American Bomber" – 0:07
"The Anderson Shelter" – 1:13
"The British Submarine" – 0:14
"The Attack" – 2:53
"The Fall Out" – 2:04
"Hilda's Hair" – 4:20
"Folded Flags" – 4:51

Personnel 
The Bleeding Heart Band
Roger Waters – bass guitar, acoustic guitar, vocals on "Towers of Faith" and "Folded Flags"
Jay Stapley – guitar
John Gordon – bass guitar
Matt Irving – keyboards, organ
Nick Glennie-Smith – piano, organ
John Lingwood – Linn programming
Freddie Krc – drums, percussion
Mel Collins – saxophone
Clare Torry – backing vocals on "Towers of Faith"
Paul Carrack – keyboards and vocals on "Folded Flags"

Home media
The film was released on VHS in the United Kingdom by CBS/Fox Video after its theatrical run, and later on laserdisc. After a short theatrical run in the United States in one theatre and grossing $5,274 at the box office in 1988, it was released on VHS by International Video Entertainment and on laserdisc by Image Entertainment. It was released on DVD in 2005 by Channel 4, with 0 region coding: the official UK DVD is still PAL format. The film was re-released on DVD in September 2010, again by Channel 4, it is formatted in NTSC and All region coding. In the United States it was released on Blu-ray on 11 November 2014 by Twilight Time in a limited edition of 3000, and in the United Kingdom, a dual-format release containing both the DVD and Blu-ray version was released on 22 January 2018 by the BFI. Severin Films released another Blu-ray and a DVD of the movie in the United States through their Severin Kids label on 21 April 2020.

See also
List of animated feature-length films
List of nuclear holocaust fiction

References

External links

 Toonhound pages on original graphic novel and animated film
 
 
 
 

1986 films
1986 animated films
1986 drama films
1980s war films
Animated drama films
British black comedy films
British animated speculative fiction films
British war drama films
British post-apocalyptic films
1980s British animated films
Cold War films
Films about World War III
1980s English-language films
Films about nuclear war and weapons
Films set in Sussex
Films based on British comics
Films based on military novels
Annecy Cristal for a Feature Film winners
Films directed by Jimmy T. Murakami
British adult animated films
1980s British films